The 15th Pan American Games were held in Rio de Janeiro, Brazil, between 13 July 2007 and 29 July 2007.

Medals

Gold

Men's Points Race: Andris Hernández

Men's Épée Individual: Rubén Limardo 
Women's Foil Individual: Mariana González 
Women's Foil Team: Jhohanna Fuenmayor, Mariana González, María Martínez and Yulitza Suárez

Men's Individual All-Around: José Luis Fuentes 
Women's Rings: Regulo Carmona

Men's Kumite (– 65 kg): Luis Plumacher

Men's Sunfish Class: Eduardo Cordeiro

Women's 50m Freestyle: Arlene Semeco 
Women's 100m Freestyle: Arlene Semeco

Women's Singles: Milagros Sequera

Silver

Men's Light-Flyweight (– 48 kg): Kevin Betancourt 
Men's Heavyweight (– 91 kg): José Payares

Men's Team Sprint: Hersony Canelón, Andris Hernández, and César Marcano
Men's Individual Sprint: Tomás Gil
Men's BMX: Jonathan Suárez

Men's Pommel Horse: José Luis Fuentes

Men's Kumite (– 70 kg): Jean Carlos Peña
Men's Kumite (+ 80 kg): Mario Toro

Men's 1500m Freestyle: Ricardo Monasterio

Bronze

Women's Individual Road Race: Danielys García 
Men's Team Pursuit: Tomás Gil, Richard Ochoa, Jaime Rivas, and Franklin Chacón
Men's Madison: Richard Ochoa and Andris Hernández
Men's BMX: José Primera 
Women's BMX: Kimmy Diquez

Women's Kumite (+ 60 kg): Yoly Guillen

Men's 100m Butterfly: Albert Subirats 
Men's 4 × 100 m Freestyle: Albert Subirats, Octavio Alesi, Luis Rojas, and Crox Acuña

Men's – 68 kg: Danny Miranda

Results by event

Triathlon

Men's Competition
José Vivas
 1:55:31.71 — 14th place
Gilberto González
 1:58:23.05 — 24th place
Camilo González
 2:00:42.09 — 26th place

Women's Competition
Rosemary López
 2:07:47.64 — 20th place

See also
 Venezuela at the 2008 Summer Olympics

External links
Rio 2007 Official website

Nations at the 2007 Pan American Games
P
2007